Thomas Eugene Bourke (May 5, 1896 – January 9, 1978)  was a United States Marine Corps general who, during World War II, commanded Marine artillery units at the Battle of Guadalcanal, Tarawa and Leyte.  At the end of World War II, he commanded the 5th Marine Division in the occupation of Japan, and the Fleet Marine Force, Pacific.

Biography

Bourke was born on May 5, 1896, in Robinson, Maryland, and later attended high school in Boonsboro, Maryland. He later attended the St. John's College, Annapolis, Maryland, and graduated with Bachelor of Arts degree. Following his graduation, Bourke served with the Maryland National Guard along the Mexican border, before he accepted the commission as second lieutenant in the Marine Corps on February 5, 1917.

While en route to Santo Domingo for his first tour, he and 50 recruits were diverted to St. Croix, becoming the first U.S. troops to land on what had just become the American Virgin Islands.

Post-World War I tours included service at Quantico, Parris Island, San Diego, and Headquarters Marine Corps. He also served at Pearl Harbor; was commanding officer of the Legation Guard in Managua, Nicaragua; saw sea duty on board the battleship ; and commanded the 10th Marine Regiment.

Following the Guadalcanal and Tarawa campaigns, General Bourke was assigned as the V Amphibious Corps artillery officer for the invasion of Saipan. He next trained combined Army-Marine artillery units for the XXIV Army Corps, then preparing for the Leyte operation. With Leyte secured, he assumed command of the 5th Marine Division which was planning for the invasion of Japan.

After the war's sudden end, the division landed at Sasebo, Kyūshū, and assumed occupation duties. With disbandment of the 5th Marine Division, General Bourke became deputy commander and inspector general of Fleet Marine Force Pacific. Bourke retired from the Marine Corps in 1946 with a rank of lieutenant general.

Bourke died in 1978.  He is buried in Arlington National Cemetery.

Awards

See also

External links
NPS biography of Thomas Bourke
Thomas Eugene Bourke, Lieutenant General, United States Marine Corps, Arlington National Cemetery profile.

1896 births
1978 deaths
United States Marine Corps World War II generals
Military personnel from Maryland
People from Washington County, Maryland
American military personnel of the Banana Wars
Recipients of the Legion of Merit
United States Marine Corps generals
Burials at Arlington National Cemetery
St. John's College (Annapolis/Santa Fe) alumni